Al-Furqan Mosque is located in the Woodside district of central Glasgow.

The Mosque
The building can accommodate 500 worshipers.

References

External links
Glasgow Al-Furqan Mosque Official site

1992 establishments in Scotland
Mosques completed in 1992
Mosques in Glasgow